Persatuan Sepakbola Ende, commonly known as Perse Ende, is an Indonesian football club based in Ende, East Nusa Tenggara. They currently compete in the Liga 3 and their homeground is Marilonga Stadium.

Honours
 El Tari Memorial Cup
 Champions (3): 1999, 2017, 2022

References

Football clubs in Indonesia
Football clubs in East Nusa Tenggara
Association football clubs established in 1958
1958 establishments in Indonesia